Port Louis is the capital of Mauritius.

Port Louis may also refer to:
 Port Louis (district), a district of Mauritius
 Port Louis, Falkland Islands, a settlement on northeastern East Falkland
 Port-Louis, Morbihan, a commune in the Morbihan department, France, near Lorient
 Port-Louis, Guadeloupe, a commune in the Guadeloupe overseas department, France